The 1876 Grand National was the 38th renewal of the Grand National horse race that took place at Aintree near Liverpool, England, on 24 March 1876.

Finishing Order

Non-finishers

References

 1876
Grand National
Grand National
19th century in Lancashire